"Music Flyer" is a song recorded and performed by Japanese collective unit E-girls, taken as a promotional single of their third studio album E.G. Time (2015). It was released on December 17, 2014 for streaming, and December 24 as a limited pre-order track to the record through digital outlets such as iTunes Store and Amazon.com; the song was made available for worldwide digital consumption on January 1, 2015, the same date as the parent record's release. It was written, composed, arranged and produced by Japanese musician and Capsule member Yasutaka Nakata, marking the band's first collaboration with him, and was co-produced by Exile Hiro.

Musically, "Music Flyer" is an electronic dance number that incorporates elements of technopop and house music, a primary sound that Nakata works with. Additionally, the recording was compared to the works of K-pop artists and the Korean wave, and was highlighted as an influence from several idol groups in Japan. Lyrically, it delves into change and moving on with life and ambitions. Upon its release, "Music Flyer" received critical acclaim from music critics, many whom selected it as the best entry to the album, and praised its composition. Critics also noted Nakata's involvement with the track as a significant factor to its success.

Despite no immediate commercial success, it was believed to be one of the most rotated tracks via airplay within Japan, between January to February 2015. In order to promote the single, it was used as the official theme song for the Japanese social app 755, which also starred selected members from E-girls, and was performed on every date for their 2016 Colorful World tour.

Background and composition
In mid-November 2014, E-girls revealed information about their third studio album E.G. Time, which was scheduled for a New Year's Day release, and their respective formats. Subsequently, several music outlets published further details about the record by the end of that month, including the jacket covers and track listing; "Music Flyer" was included on the list at number four, and was confirmed by the group's management LDH. On December 16, the band confirmed their involvement with the Japanese communication and social app 755, which allows fans to connect with their favourite musicians that are signed to the company; the girls additionally confirmed that the official theme sound would be "Music Flyer", and would distributed on December 24, 2014 as a pre-ordered track to E.G. Time. However, its release was pushed forward, and begun streaming via iTunes Store and Amazon.com in Japan on December 17. Furthermore, the track, amongst other entries, were made available for digital consumption seven days later, as part of a limited pre-order campaign for the parent record.

"Music Flyer" was written, composed, arranged and produced by Japanese musician and Capsule member Yasutaka Nakata, marking the band's first collaboration with him. The musician was in fact working with other artists at the time, namely Japanese singer Kyary Pamyu Pamyu, and technopop trio Perfume, and accepted an offer to work with E-girls. Musically, it is an electronic dance number that incorporates elements of technopop and house music, a primary sound that Nakata works with. In a similar analysis, Patrick St. Michel from The Japan Times believed the track was inspired by the effects of the Korean wave, namely the musical element of K-pop. Serving as the only songwriter to the recording, Nakata expressed that he wanted the lyrical content to discusses the themes of change and moving onwards. He explained that the group's release was heading into the New Year, and wanted to feel like it was "new wind" at an "accelerating force". It is one of two original songs from E.G. Time to feature all remaining vocalists of the band up until E-girls and Flower member, Chiharu Muto, left both groups in October 2014; these singers are Shizuka, Aya, Ami, Erie, Karen Fujii, Ruri Kawamoto, Reina Washio, Kyoka Ichiki and Yuzuna Takebe. Additionally, it is also one of the final recordings to feature Kyoka Ichiki, whom departed from the two same groups in October that year.

Reception
Upon its release, "Music Flyer" received critical acclaim from music critics. Writing for The Japan Times, Patrick St. Michel highlighted the number as his favorite track from the album. He believed "Music Flyer" was the only example from E.G. Time where E-girls "buck most of the major idol trends", and additionally "shun idol-standard amateurism in favor of K-pop-like precision,". In conclusion, he praised its catchiness and production. In a similar review, CD Journal selected it as one of the better cuts from the record, and praised Nakata's songwriting and "uplifting" involvement, to which the magazine felt it had the "Yasutaka Nakata seal". The writer had personally noted that it made his/her "heart bounce" once its played. An editor from Barks.jp also enjoyed the track, calling it a "stand out" to Nakata and the girls discography, and described it as a "power[ful] dance tune". In an article written by a staff member of OKmusic.jp, they commended the tracks dance sound, and credited Nakata's involvement as part of this. Additionally, he/she had high prospects for the tracks success within 2015. Commercially, "Music Flyer" did not enter any component charts inside of Japan, but according to Okmusic.jp, the recording was one of the most heavily rotated numbers between January–February 2015.

Promotion and performances
In order to promote the single, E-girls took part on a commercial for the Japanese communication and social app 755, who also teamed up with another Japanese group, AKB48. Members Shizuka, Aya, Ami from Dream, Karen Fujii and Kaede from Happiness, and Shuuka Fujii and Reina Washio from Flower participated in two live commercials; the first showcased each member performing "Music Flyer" on stage with additional information about the app, while the second featured Aya chanting to the girls as they all go towards the stage; Ami is then seen using the app on her phone. The video premiered on December 15 on the Maidigi TV YouTube channel, and was published throughout Japan two days later. On December 16, both AKB48 and E-girls members Washio, Karen and Shuuka Fujii and Kaede made an appearance at a press conference talking about the app and "Music Flyer". The track continued to be its theme song until March 12, 2016. So far, the band have included the recording on one of their concert tours; the Colorful World 2015 show, where it appeared as the opening number. The track was included on every tour date, and subsequently added onto their live release that coincided with the triple DVD/Blu-ray bundles for their greatest hits album E.G. Smile: E-girls Best (2016).

Track listing
Digital download
"Music Flyer" – 3:38

Personnel
Credits adapted from the CD liner notes of the parent album E.G. Time.

Vocalists

Shizuka – vocals, background vocals
Aya – vocals, background vocals, leader 
Ami – vocals, background vocals
Erie Abe – vocals, background vocals, leader 
Karen Fujii – vocals, background vocals 
Ruri Kawamoto – vocals, background vocals 
Reina Washio – vocals, background vocals 
Kyoka Ichiki – vocals, background vocals 
Yuzuna Takabe – vocals, background vocals 

Performers

Sayaka – performer
Kaede – performer
Karen Fujii – performer
Miyuu – performer
Yurino – performer
Anna Suda – performer
Shuuka Fujii – performer
Manami Shigetome – performer
Mio Nakajima – performer
Nozomi Bando – performer
Harumi Sato – performer
Anna Ishii – performer
Nonoka Yamaguchi – performer
Yuzuna Takabe – performer

Production

Yasutaka Nakata – arranger, producer
Exile Hiro – producer

Release history

Notes

References

External links
E.G. Time at the official E-girls websites. 

2015 songs
2015 singles
E-girls songs
Songs written by Yasutaka Nakata
Rhythm Zone singles